Alla Hasanova (born 6 August 1970) is an Azerbaijani volleyball player, who competed for the Women's National Team at the 1994 FIVB Volleyball Women's World Championship in Brazil. At the 2005 Women's European Volleyball Championship in Croatia she ended up in fourth place with the national squad, and was named Best Server of the tournament.

Clubs
 Emlak Bank Ankara (1994)

Individual awards
 2005 European Championship "Best Server"

References
 FIVB Profile

1970 births
Living people
Azerbaijani women's volleyball players
Place of birth missing (living people)
20th-century Azerbaijani women